The Russia national under-19 football team, controlled by the Russian Football Union, represents Russia at the European Under-19 Football Championship and international friendly match fixtures at the under-19 age level.

On 28 February 2022, in accordance with a "recommendation" by the International Olympic Committee (IOC), FIFA and UEFA suspended the participation of Russia, including in the Qatar 2022 World Cup. The Russian Football Union unsuccessfully appealed the FIFA and UEFA bans to the Court of Arbitration for Sport, which upheld the bans.

History

European Championships 
Since the tournament adopted its current under-19 format in 2002, the Russia under-19s have qualified for only two UEFA European Under-19 Football Championship. They have, however, reached the second, or elite, qualification stage in all campaigns with the exception of 2002 when they were knocked out at the preliminary qualification stage. They came closest to qualifying for the 2010 competition, when they finished one point behind group winners Italy in the elite qualification stage.

In the 2011 qualification campaign, Russia again narrowly missed out on the finals, finishing second in group five of the elite qualifying stage, having drawn two games and won one against Israel. The group winner was the Czech Republic. The joint top scorers for Russia in the qualification campaign for 2011 were Aleksandr Kozlov and Georgi Nurov, who both scored two goals in three games.

Russia's best performance at the European Championships was in 2015 in Greece. After being qualified to the final tournament for the first time since 2007, team Russia also stood at the top position of Group B of the Group Stage along with Spain. In the semifinals Russia beat hosts Greece 4–0. The team eventually became runners-up, after Spain made two goals to win the trophy.

UEFA U-19 Championship Record 
FIFA considers Russia the direct successor to the Soviet Union, and therefore the inheritor to all its records.

 Champions   Runners-Up   Third Place   Fourth Place

Honours 
 UEFA European Under-19 Football Championship (Under-18 before 2002) 
  Winners (6): 1966 (shared with Italy), 1967, 1976, 1978, 1988, 1990
  Runners-up (2): 1984, 2015
 Granatkin Memorial 
  Winners (20): 1982, 1983, 1985, 1986, 1987, 1988, 1989, 1990, 1991, 2001, 2002, 2004, 2005, 2008, 2009, 2010, 2013, 2015, 2017, 2018
  Runners-up (9): 1981, 1984, 1987, 1991, 1992, 2013, 2014, 2016, 2019

Recent results and forthcoming fixtures

Current squad

References

European national under-19 association football teams
U19